Mi-Chemin is Yuki Uchida's second album, released in Japan on 21 September 1995 by King Records (reference: KICS-510). It reached number three on the Oricon charts.

Track listing

 Made in Asia (MADE IN ASIA)  
 
  
  
  
  
  
  
  
 Baby's Growing Up ~Slow version~ (BABY'S GROWING UP ~SLOW VERSION~) 
 Bonus Track : Only You ~Tribal Mix~ 

1995 albums
Yuki Uchida albums